B'er Chayim Temple (Hebrew for Well of Life, a metaphor in which Torah is likened to water) is a synagogue in Cumberland, Maryland that is currently affiliated with the Reform movement. B'er Chayim counts approximately 72 families as members.

B'er Chayim is the oldest synagogue building in continuous use as a synagogue in Maryland and the sixth oldest in the United States.

Clergy and leadership
Mark J. Perman has served as the rabbi of B'er Chayim since July 2016. A native of New York City, Perman graduated from the High School of Performing Arts, Hebrew Union College-Jewish Institute of Religion, and New York University. Perman was ordained a cantor in 1997, and he was ordained a rabbi by Mesifta Program in Queens, New York, in 2013. Prior to joining B'er Chayim, Perman served as the interim cantor at Congregation Emanu El in Houston.

Lee Schwartz serves as president of B'er Chayim.

Religious services and programs
Shabbat services are held Friday evening. Services and celebrations of Jewish holidays, such as Rosh Hashanah, Yom Kippur, and Chanukah, are held throughout the year.

Torah study sessions are held twice a month.

History
The first Jewish resident recorded in Cumberland dates to 1816.  Twelve Jewish families were living in Cumberland, which then had a population of 6,150, in 1853 when congregation B'er Chayim was chartered by the Maryland state legislature. The congregation was Orthodox when the temple was built, although it is now a Reform congregation.

Between 1865 and 1867, the congregation built a two-story, Greek Revival synagogue building on the corner of South Centre and Union Streets. The building cost $7,427.02 to construct. The facade is ornamented with four pilasters, a handsome pediment, and four very un-Greek Rundbogenstil, or round-arched, windows. The building was constructed by local builder John B. Walton.

Prayers and sermons were originally held in German, rather than Hebrew.

Beth Jacob Synagogue, which was also located in Cumberland, merged with B'er Chayim Temple in 1996.

In 2011, the synagogue underwent renovation. The brickwork's mortar was redone, the wrought iron gates outside the entrance were restored, improved the interior, and made the synagogue wheelchair-accessible. The synagogue's building was reopened on August 17, 2014, and the synagogue was rededicated on November 7, 2014. The Cumberland Historic Preservation Board gave an award to B'er Chayim for the synagogue's restoration.

See also

 1866 in architecture
 List of synagogues in the United States

References

External links

 
 , including 1979 photo, at Maryland Historical Trust

1866 establishments in Maryland
Ashkenazi synagogues
Buildings and structures in Cumberland, Maryland
Downtown Cumberland, Maryland
German-Jewish culture in Maryland
Greek Revival architecture in Maryland
Greek Revival synagogues
Jews and Judaism in Appalachia
National Register of Historic Places in Allegany County, Maryland
Religious buildings and structures in Allegany County, Maryland
Synagogues on the National Register of Historic Places in Maryland
Religion in Cumberland, MD-WV-PA
Synagogues completed in 1866
Religious organizations established in 1853